Ninotchka is a 1939 American romantic comedy film made for Metro-Goldwyn-Mayer by producer and director Ernst Lubitsch and starring Greta Garbo and Melvyn Douglas. It was written by Billy Wilder, Charles Brackett, and Walter Reisch, based on a screen story by Melchior Lengyel. Ninotchka is Greta Garbo's first full comedy, and her penultimate film; she received her third and final Academy Award nomination for Best Actress. It is one of the first American films which, under the cover of a satirical, light romance, depicted the Soviet Union under Joseph Stalin as being rigid and gray, in this instance comparing it with the free and sunny Parisian society of pre-war years. In 1990, Ninotchka was selected for preservation in the United States National Film Registry by the Library of Congress as being "culturally, historically, or aesthetically significant". In 2011, Time also included the film on the magazine's list of "All-Time 100 Movies".

Plot
Iranoff (Sig Ruman), Buljanoff (Felix Bressart), and Kopalski (Alexander Granach), three agents from the Russian Board of Trade arrive in Paris to sell jewelry confiscated from the aristocracy during the Russian Revolution of 1917.

Count Alexis Rakonin (Gregory Gaye), a White Russian nobleman reduced to employment as a waiter in the hotel where the trio are staying, overhears details of their mission and informs the former Russian Grand Duchess Swana (Ina Claire) that her court jewels are to be sold by the three men. Her debonair paramour, Count Léon d'Algout (Melvyn Douglas) offers to help retrieve the jewelry before it is sold.

In their hotel suite, Iranoff, Buljanoff and Kopalski negotiate with Mercier (Edwin Maxwell) a prominent Parisian jeweler, when Léon interrupts the meeting. He explains that the jewels were seized illegally by the Soviet government and a petition has been filed preventing their sale or removal. Mercier withdraws his offer to purchase the jewelry until the lawsuit is settled.

The amiable, charming and cunning Léon treats the three Russians to an extravagant lunch, gets them drunk and easily wins their friendship and confidence. He sends a telegram to Moscow in their name suggesting a compromise.

Moscow, angered by the telegram, then sends Nina Ivanovna "Ninotchka" Yakushova (Greta Garbo), a special envoy whose goal is to win the lawsuit, complete the jewelry sale and return with the three renegade Russians. Ninotchka is methodical, rigid and stern, chastising Iranoff, Buljanoff and Kopalski for failing to complete their mission.

Ninotchka and Léon first meet outside the hotel, their respective identities unknown to one another. He flirts, but she is uninterested. Intrigued, Léon follows her to the Eiffel Tower and shows her his home through a telescope. Intrigued by his behavior, Ninotchka tells him he might warrant study and suggests they go to his apartment. Ninotchka becomes attracted to Léon and eventually, they begin to kiss but are interrupted by a phone call from Buljanoff. Both realizing they are each other's adversaries over the jewelry, Ninotchka promptly leaves Léon's apartment, despite his protestations.

While attending to the various legal matters over the lawsuit, Ninotchka gradually becomes seduced by the west and by the persistent Léon, who has fallen in love with her and broken down her resistance. At a dinner date with Léon where she unexpectedly meets Swana face-to-face (her rival for the jewelry and for Léon's affections), Ninotchka consumes champagne for the first time and quickly becomes intoxicated. The following afternoon, a hungover Ninotchka is awakened by Swana and discovers Rakonin has stolen the jewelry during the night. Swana tells Ninotchka that she will return the jewels and drop the litigation if Ninotchka returns to Moscow immediately so that Swana can have Léon to herself. Ninotchka reluctantly agrees to Swana's proposal and after completing the sale of the jewelry to Mercier, Ninotchka and the three Russians fly back to Moscow.
Meanwhile, Léon visits Swana and confesses his love for Ninotchka. Swana then informs Léon that Ninotchka has already left for Moscow. He attempts to follow her but is denied a Russian visa, because of his nobility.

Sometime later, in Moscow, Ninotchka invites her three comrades to her communal apartment for dinner and they nostalgically recall their time in Paris. After dinner, Ninotchka finally receives a letter from Léon, but it has been completely censored by the authorities, and she is devastated.

More time passes; Iranoff, Buljanoff and Kopalski once again run afoul of their superiors after they fail at their mission to sell furs in Constantinople. Against her wishes, Ninotchka is sent by Commissar Razinin (Bela Lugosi) to investigate and retrieve the trio.

After Ninotchka arrives in Constantinople, the three Russians inform her that they have opened a restaurant and will not be returning to Moscow. When Ninotchka asks them who was responsible for this idea, they point to a balcony where Léon is standing. He explains that he was barred from entering Russia to win Ninotchka back, so he and the three Russians conspired to get her to leave the country. He asks her to stay with him and she happily agrees.

The final shot in the film is of Kopalski carrying a protest sign complaining that Iranoff and Buljanoff are unfair, because his name does not illuminate on the electric sign in front of their new restaurant.

Cast

Release
The movie was released in late 1939, shortly after the outbreak of World War II in Europe, where it became a great success. It was, however, banned in the Soviet Union and its satellites. Despite that, it went on to make $2,279,000 worldwide. USA: $1,187,000. International: $1,092,000. Profit: $138,000.

In a play on the famous "Garbo Talks!" ad campaign used for her "talkie" debut in Anna Christie (1930), Ninotchka was marketed with the catchphrase "Garbo Laughs!", commenting on Garbo's largely somber and melancholy image (though Garbo laughs several times in many of her previous pictures).

Reception

Critical response
When the film was first released, The New York Times film critic Frank S. Nugent praised it:

More recently, in 2008, film critic Dennis Schwartz discussed the humor of Ninotchka:

Revival
An attempt by MGM to re-release Ninotchka later during World War II was suppressed on the grounds that the Soviets were then allies of the West. The film was re-released after the war ended.

Legacy
In 1955, the musical Silk Stockings, based on Ninotchka,  opened on Broadway. Written by Cole Porter, the stage production was based on Ninotchka's story and script and starred Hildegard Neff and Don Ameche. MGM then produced a 1957 film version of the musical  directed by Rouben Mamoulian and starring Fred Astaire and Cyd Charisse. Actor George Tobias, who appeared uncredited in Ninotchka as the Russian official who is punched by Leon for refusing him a visa is featured as Commissar Markovitch in Silk Stockings. Rolfe Sedan, who portrayed the hotel manager in Ninotchka, appears uncredited as a stage manager in Silk Stockings. The MGM films Comrade X (1940), starring Clark Gable and Hedy Lamarr, and The Iron Petticoat (1956), starring Bob Hope and Katharine Hepburn, both borrow heavily from Ninotchka.

MGM had scheduled Madame Curie as Garbo's next film, but pleased with the success of Ninotchka, the studio quickly decided to team Garbo and Douglas in another romantic comedy. Two-Faced Woman (1941) was the result and Garbo received the worst reviews of her entire career. It turned out to be her final film and Greer Garson eventually starred in Madame Curie.

The Japanese filmmaker Akira Kurosawa cited Ninotchka as one of his favorite films.

Ninotchka is recognized as well by the American Film Institute in the AFI 100 Years... series in the following lists:

 1998: AFI's 100 Years...100 Movies – Nominated
 2000: AFI's 100 Years...100 Laughs – #52
 2002: AFI's 100 Years...100 Passions – #40
 2005: AFI's 100 Years...100 Movie Quotes:
 Leon: "Ninotchka, it's midnight. One half of Paris is making love to the other half." -– Nominated
 Ninotchka: "Must you flirt?"
 Leon: "Well, I don't have to, but I find it natural."
 Ninotchka: "Suppress it." – Nominated
 2007: AFI's 100 Years...100 Movies – Nominated

Awards
Ninotchka received four Academy Award nominations: Best Picture, Best Actress in a Leading Role, Best Original Story, and Best Screenplay.

Origins
Ninotchka is based on a three-sentence story idea by Melchior Lengyel that made its debut at a poolside conference in 1937, when a suitable comedy vehicle for Garbo was being sought by MGM: “Russian girl saturated with Bolshevist ideals goes to fearful, capitalistic, monopolistic Paris. She meets romance and has an uproarious good time. Capitalism not so bad, after all.”

References

External links
 
 
 
 
 
 
 

1939 films
1939 romantic comedy films
American romantic comedy films
American political satire films
American black-and-white films
Defection in fiction
1930s English-language films
Films about communism
Films critical of communism
Films directed by Ernst Lubitsch
Films set in the 1930s
Films set in Istanbul
Films set in Moscow
Films set in Paris
Metro-Goldwyn-Mayer films
United States National Film Registry films
Films about the Soviet Union in the Stalin era
Films with screenplays by Billy Wilder
Films with screenplays by Charles Brackett
1930s American films